László Buronyi (1918 – 1982) was a Hungarian weightlifter. He competed at the 1948 Summer Olympics and the 1952 Summer Olympics.

References

1918 births
1982 deaths
Hungarian male weightlifters
Olympic weightlifters of Hungary
Weightlifters at the 1948 Summer Olympics
Weightlifters at the 1952 Summer Olympics
People from Krompachy
Sportspeople from the Košice Region